The Louisiana Civil Code (LCC) constitutes the core of private law in the State of Louisiana. The Louisiana Civil Code is based on a more diverse set of sources than the laws of the other 49 states of the United States: substantive law between private sector parties has a civil law character, based on French and Spanish codes and ultimately Roman law, with some common law influences.

First enacted on March 31, 1808, in bilingual version as Louisiana Civil Code Digest., it was drafted by the lawyers James Brown, Louis Moreau-Lislet and Edward Livingston. Afterwards it underwent continuous revisions and updates. It is still considered the controlling authority in the state; despite the strong influence of common law tradition, the civil law tradition is still deeply rooted in most aspects of Louisiana private law. Thus property, contractual, business entities structure, much of civil procedure, and family law, as well as some aspects of criminal law, are still based mostly on traditional Roman legal thinking.

In 1825 it served as a source for the Civil Code of Lower Canada.

See also
 Law of Louisiana
 Edward Livingston
 Civil Law Commentaries
 Athanassios Nicholas Yiannopoulos
 Philip H. Morgan

References

Further reading
 Cairns, John W. (2015). Codification, transplants and history: law reform in Louisiana (1808) and Quebec (1866). Clark, NJ: Talbot Publishing.
 
 Palmer, Vernon V. (2021). The lost translators of 1808 and the birth of civil law in Louisiana. Athens, GA: The University of Georgia Press.

External links
Louisiana Civil Code

Civil codes
Louisiana law